Marcus Falkner Cunliffe (1922–1990) was a British scholar who specialized in cultural and military American Studies. He was particularly interested in comparing how Europeans viewed Americans and how Americans viewed Europeans.

Biography
Cunliffe was born in Lancashire. He read history at  Oriel College, Oxford and Sandhurst, served in the British Army during World War II. From 1947 to 1949 he was at Yale, where he was Harkness Fellow. It was in the US that he met his first wife, Mitzi Solomon, and they returned together in 1949 to the UK. From 1949 to 1964 Cunliffe taught American history at the University of Manchester. They were divorced in 1971. That same year he married Lesley Hume. Their marriage was dissolved in 1980. From 1965 to 1980, Cunliffe was Professor of American Studies at the University of Sussex,  which established the Cunliffe Centre in 1991. From 1980 Cunliffe was University Professor at George Washington University.

Cunliffe wrote or edited  more than 15 books on history and literature. Cunliffe's best known early work was George Washington: Man and Monument, published in 1958. His papers are held at George Washington University's Special Collections Research Center, located in the Estelle and Melvin Gelman Library.

Cunliffe died of leukemia in Washington D.C. on September 2, 1990.

Works
 The American Presidency
 The Literature of the United States (1954)
 Marcus Cunliffe and Robin W. Winks, eds. Pastmasters: Some Essays on American Historians (1969)
 Marcus Cunliffe. Soldiers and Civilians: The Martial Spirit in America, 1775–1865 (1969).
 George Washington: Man and Monument (1958)

References

Further reading
 Brian Holden Reid, ‘Cunliffe, Marcus Falkner (1922–1990)’, Oxford Dictionary of National Biography, Oxford University Press, 2004, accessed 5 June 2007
 Guide to the Marcus Cunliffe Papers, 1960-1990, Special Collections Research Center, Estelle and Melvin Gelman Library, The George Washington University

1922 births
1990 deaths
Alumni of Oriel College, Oxford
Yale University alumni
Academics of the Victoria University of Manchester
Academics of the University of Sussex
Harkness Fellows
Harvard University faculty
Graduates of the Royal Military College, Sandhurst
Royal Tank Regiment officers
British Army personnel of World War II
British expatriates in the United States
Military personnel from Lancashire